The 2024–2025 Vendée Globe is a non-stop round the world yacht race for IMOCA 60 class yachts crewed by only one person. It will be the tenth edition of the race, and will start and finish in Les Sables-d'Olonne, France. The race will begin on 10 November 2024.

Indicated competitors
The race organisers have published the initial notice of race allowing a record entry of 40 boats to complete. The rules now prohibit older IMOCA 60 from competing with 2008 generation boats being the oldest allowed to compete. At the start of 2022, there were 55 skippers intending to compete. Italian sailor Fabrice Amedeo lost his boat Newrest – Art & Fenêtres while doing a qualifying race.

The following is a list of eligible boats together with the skipper who has secured the use of the boat to compete:

References

External links
 Official Website
 Official You Tube Channel
 Official Facebook Page

Vendée Globe
Vendée Globe
Vendée Globe
Vendée Globe
Vendée Globe